József Nagy (15 October 1892 – 17 January 1963) was a Hungarian footballer and manager from Budapest. He is most noted for his career as a footballing manager; Nagy managed the Swedish national football team and Swedish clubs and then he moved on to Serie A, where he managed three clubs, Pro Vercelli, Bologna and Genoa. He also managed Brage.

Honours
Bologna
Mitropa Cup (1): 1932

References

1892 births
1963 deaths
Footballers from Budapest
Hungarian footballers
Association football midfielders
Hungarian football managers
IFK Malmö Fotboll managers
Sweden national football team managers
1934 FIFA World Cup managers
1938 FIFA World Cup managers
IFK Göteborg managers
IK Brage managers
Åtvidabergs FF managers
Hungarian expatriate football managers
Expatriate football managers in Italy
Expatriate football managers in Sweden
Hungarian expatriate sportspeople in Italy
Hungarian expatriate sportspeople in Sweden
IK Oddevold managers